Thamnodynastes pallidus is a species of snake in the family Colubridae. The species is endemic to South America.

Geographic range
T. pallidus is found in Argentina, Bolivia, Brazil, Colombia, French Guiana, Guyana, Paraguay, Peru, Suriname, and Venezuela.

References

Further reading
Freiberg M (1982). Snakes of South America. Hong Kong: T.F.H. Publications. 189 pp. (Thamnodynastes pallidus, p. 112).
Linnaeus C (1758). Systema naturæ per regna tria naturæ, secundum classes, ordines, genera, species, cum characteribus, differentiis, synonymis, locis. Tomus I. Editio Decima, Reformata. Stockholm: L. Salvius. 824 pp. (Coluber pallidus, new species, p. 221). (in Latin).

Reptiles described in 1758
Colubrids
Taxa named by Carl Linnaeus
Reptiles of Argentina
Reptiles of Bolivia
Reptiles of Brazil
Reptiles of Colombia
Reptiles of French Guiana
Reptiles of Guyana
Reptiles of Paraguay
Reptiles of Peru
Reptiles of Suriname
Reptiles of Venezuela
Snakes of South America